Raman Vasilyuk (born 23 November 1978) is a former Belarusian footballer.

Career
He has played for Dinamo Brest, Slavia Mozyr, Spartak Moscow, Dinamo Minsk, Hapoel Tel Aviv, Gomel, Minsk, BATE Borisov, Neman Grodno, and was a member of the Belarus national team.

Vasilyuk is currently an all-time top scorer of Belarusian Premier League, having scored over 200 goals since his debut in 1996.

Honours

Club
Slavia Mozyr
Belarusian Premier League champion: 2000
Belarusian Cup winner: 1999–2000

Spartak Moscow
Russian Premier League champion: 2001

Dinamo Minsk
Belarusian Cup winner: 2002–03

BATE Borisov
Belarusian Premier League champion: 2012

Minsk
Belarusian Cup winner: 2012–13

Dinamo Brest
Belarusian Cup winner: 2016–17, 2017–18
Belarusian Super Cup winner: 2018

Individual 
Belarusian Premier League top scorer (2): 2000, 2007
CIS Cup top goalscorer: 2001 (shared)

International goals

References

External links
 
 

1978 births
Living people
Belarusian footballers
Association football forwards
Belarus international footballers
Belarusian expatriate footballers
Expatriate footballers in Russia
Russian Premier League players
Expatriate footballers in Israel
FC Dynamo Brest players
FC Slavia Mozyr players
FC Dinamo Minsk players
FC Spartak Moscow players
Hapoel Tel Aviv F.C. players
FC Gomel players
FC Minsk players
FC BATE Borisov players
FC Neman Grodno players
Sportspeople from Brest, Belarus